George Campbell may refer to:

Sportsmen 
George Campbell (rugby union) (1872–1924), Scotland international rugby union player
George Campbell (footballer, born 1957), Scottish footballer
George Campbell (footballer, born 1864) (1864–1898), Scottish footballer
George Campbell (footballer, born 1920), Scottish footballer
George Campbell (New Zealand footballer), association football player who represented New Zealand
George Campbell (lacrosse) (1878–1972), Canadian dentist and sportsman
George Campbell (cricketer, born 1979), English cricketer
George Campbell (cricketer, born 1847) (1847–1930), English cricketer
George Campbell (American football) (born 1996), high school football All-American
George P. Campbell (1871–?), American football and basketball coach, teacher, and administrator
George Campbell (soccer) (born 2001), American soccer player

Politicians 
George Campbell (Australian politician) (born 1943), senator from the Australian Labor Party in New South Wales
George Campbell (New South Wales politician) (1827–1890), member of the New South Wales Parliament
George W. Campbell (1769–1848), American statesman
George Campbell, 6th Duke of Argyll (1768–1839), Whig MP
George Campbell (civil servant) (1824–1892), Scottish Member of Parliament
George Campbell, 8th Duke of Argyll (1823–1900), Scottish Liberal politician
George Campbell (Canadian politician) (1844–?), farmer and political figure in Ontario
George Glover Campbell (1887–1967), Australian politician, member of the New South Wales Legislative Assembly
Sir George Campbell, statesman

Others 
George Campbell of Inverneill (1803–1882), Commandant of the Royal Artillery and served in the East India Company
George Campbell (minister) (1719–1796), Scottish Enlightenment philosopher, minister, theologian, and professor of divinity
Sir George Campbell (Royal Navy officer) (1759–1821)
George Campbell (1838–1915), Congregational minister, father of Alexander Petrie Campbell
George Campbell (murder victim) (died 1871), Canadian farmer who was murdered by his wife
George Campbell (town marshal) (1850–1881), town marshal for El Paso, TX, one of four victims killed in the Four Dead in Five Seconds Gunfight
George Ashley Campbell (1870–1954), American electrical engineer
George L. Campbell (1912–2004), Scottish polyglot and linguist at the BBC 
George M. Campbell (1907–1942), United States Navy officer and Navy Cross recipient
George Campbell (painter) (1917–1979), Irish painter and writer
George Campbell Jr. (born 1945), President of the Cooper Union